Krascheninnikovia lanata is a species of flowering plant in the family Amaranthaceae, known by the common name winterfat.  It is native to much of western North America: from central Western Canada; through the Western United States; to northern Mexico.

The genus was named for Stepan Krasheninnikov—the early 18th-century Russian botanist and explorer of Siberia and Kamchatka.

Distribution and habitat

Winterfat is a halophyte that thrives in salty soils such as those on alkali flats, including those of the Great Basin, Central Valley, Great Plains, and Mojave Desert.

Description
Krascheninnikovia lanata is a small shrub sending erect stem branches to heights between 0. It produces flat lance-shaped leaves up to 3 centimeters long. The stems and gray foliage are covered in woolly white hairs that age to a reddish color.

The tops of the stem branches are occupied by plentiful spike inflorescences from March to June. The shrub is generally monoecious, with each upright inflorescence holding mostly staminate flowers with a few pistillate flowers clustered near the bottom. The staminate flowers have large, woolly leaflike bracts.

The pistillate flowers have smaller bracts and develop tiny white fruits. The silky hairs on the fruits allow for wind dispersal.

Cultivation
Krascheninnikovia lanata is cultivated in the specialty plant nursery trade as an ornamental plant for xeriscape and wildlife gardens, and native plant natural landscapes.  The light gray foliage can be a distinctive feature in garden designs. The plants are very long-lived.

Uses
This species is an important winter forage for grazing domestic and wild animals because it is evergreen, hence its common name.

Native American use
Winter fat was a traditional medicinal plant used by many Native American tribes that lived within its large North American range. These tribes used traditional plants to treat a wide variety of ailments and for other benefits. The Zuni people use a poultice of ground root bound with a cotton cloth to treat burns.

References

External links

Jepson Manual Treatment - Krascheninnikovia lanata (Winterfat)
USDA: Plants Profile of Krascheninnikovia lanata - with numerous Related Web Sites links.
U.S. Forest Service: Krascheninnikovia lanata Ecology
Native American Ethnobotany - 'Winterfat' - (University of Michigan - Dearborn)
Krascheninnikovia lanata (Winterfat) - U.C. Photo gallery

Chenopodioideae
Halophytes
Flora of Northwestern Mexico
Flora of the Southwestern United States
Flora of the Northwestern United States
Flora of Western Canada
Flora of Yukon
Flora of the Rocky Mountains
Flora of the Great Basin
Flora of the Sierra Nevada (United States)
Flora of the California desert regions
Forages
Plants used in traditional Native American medicine
Garden plants of North America
Drought-tolerant plants
Flora without expected TNC conservation status